J67 may refer to:
 Biaugmented truncated cube
 LNER Class J67, a British steam locomotive class
 Wright J67, a turbojet engine